Marina Vasilyevna Goncharova (née Ponyarova; born 26 April 1986) is a Russian heptathlete. She was born in Kemerovo.

Achievements

References

1986 births
Living people
Russian heptathletes
People from Kemerovo
Sportspeople from Kemerovo Oblast